Lanexang United Football Club (Laos ສະໂມສອນລ້ານຊ້າງຢູໄນເຕັດ) was a Laotian professional football club based in Vientiane, Laos. They were the champions of the 2016 Lao Premier League before withdrawing from the competition. Their home stadium was Lanexang Stadium.

Former players
  Khonesavanh Sihavong
  Daoneua Siviengxay
  Sengdao Inthilath
  Vilayout Sayyabounsou
  Phoutthasay Khochalern
  Aaron Evans
  Kaz Patafta
  Alireza Jamali
  Diego Emilio Silva
  Argzim Redžović

Continental record

Honours

Domestic competitions 
 Lao Premier League 
 Winners (1): 2016

International competitions
Mekong Club Championship
2016: Runners-up

Managers

Sponsors

Affiliated clubs
  Nakhon Phanom

References

 
Football clubs in Laos